Grant Sampson (born 26 January 1982) is an South African professional darts player who currently plays in the Professional Darts Corporation (PDC) and other national events. He qualified for the 2023 PDC World Darts Championship by winning the African Qualifier to make his first appearance at the Worlds.

Career
In October 2022, Sampson defeated Laezeltrich Wentzel to win the African Qualifier (after earlier beating heavy favourite Devon Petersen) and qualify for the 2023 PDC World Darts Championship, his debut year at the competition. He was defeated by 31st seed Kim Huybrechts 0–3 in the second round, having defeated Keane Barry 3–1 in his first round match.

World Championship results

PDC
 2023: Second round (lost to Kim Huybrechts 0–3) (sets)

Performance timeline

References 

South African darts players
1982 births
Living people
People from Cape Town
Professional Darts Corporation associate players